Nude is the fourth studio album by British pop group Dead or Alive, released in 1988 on Epic Records. The band lost their foothold in the UK and U.S. charts with this album, but it proved to be a massive success in Japan, where the single "Turn Around and Count 2 Ten" spent 147 days at number one.  "Come Home (With Me Baby)" also topped the U.S. Hot Dance Music/Club Play chart.  Much like their greatest hits package Rip It Up, the songs on Nude run together with no spaces in between to create a non-stop DJ-mix type presentation.

A companion remix album was released in Japan shortly after with the title Nude – Remade Remodelled.

Track listing
All tracks written by Pete Burns and Steve Coy.

Personnel
Adapted from the album's liner notes.

Dead or Alive
Pete Burns – vocals
Mike Percy – bass guitar, guitars
Tim Lever – keyboards
Steve Coy – drums

Additional personnel
Andy Stennet – additional keyboards
Tracy Ackerman, Laura Pallas, Jackie Raw – backing vocals

Production
All tracks produced, arranged and mixed by Pete Burns and Steve Coy
Tracks 1, 3 & 5 engineered and mixed by Bruce Robins, re-recorded and mixed by Phil Bodger
House engineers: Paul Cartledge, Simon Clay
Assistant engineers: Benjamin Hallowell, Garrison III
Recorded and mixed at Good Earth Studios, London
Digitally edited by Simon Everett at Mayfair
Photography: Paul Cox, Peter Brown, Marti & Pierre Chan

Chart performance

References

External links

1988 albums
Dead or Alive (band) albums
Epic Records albums